Felix de Andreis (May 1, 1778– October 15, 1820) was the first superior of the Congregation of the Mission (Lazarists) in the United States and Vicar-General of upper Louisiana in St. Louis.

Andreis was born in northern Italy. His early theology teaching career was at the College of the Propaganda in Rome, a school that trained priests for mission work. Louis Dubourg recruited Andres in 1815 to work in the Missouri Territory. He arrived in St. Louis in 1817. Appointed Vicar-General by Dubourg, Andreis also directed several educational and spiritual endeavors, including acting as spiritual director of Rose Philippine Duchesne.

References

History of Catholicism in the United States
American Servants of God
Vincentians
1778 births
1820 deaths
People from Demonte